Hearing Voices Networks, closely related to the Hearing Voices Movement, are peer-focused national organizations for people who hear voices (commonly referred to as auditory hallucinations) and supporting family members, activists and mental health practitioners. Members may or may not have a psychiatric diagnosis. Networks promote an alternative approach, where voices are not necessarily seen as signs of mental illness and regard hearing voices as a meaningful and understandable, although unusual, human variation. Voices are not seen as the problem, rather it is the relationship the person has with their voices that is regarded as the main issue.

Development
The first hearing voices network was founded in the Netherlands in 1987 by the Dutch psychiatrist Marius Romme, the science journalist, Sandra Escher, and voice hearer, Patsy Hage. This was followed by the founding of the UK network in 1988 based in Manchester, England. Subsequently networks have been established in 29 countries over the world, including Australia, Canada, the UK, and the United States. The first 15 years of the global networks' development is outlined by Adam James in his book Raising Our Voices (2001).

The National and Regional Networks are affiliated with the international umbrella organization known as INTERVOICE (The International Network for Training Education and Research into Hearing Voices) and often referred to as the Hearing Voices Movement. Within these international networks, the combined experience of voice-hearers and professionals have overseen the development of ways of working with people who hear voices, drawing on the value of peer support and helping people live peacefully and positively with their experiences.

Purpose
The principal roles of Hearing Voices Networks are as follows:
 To support and develop local Hearing Voices Support Groups
Raise awareness of the hearing voices approach
To campaign for human rights and social justice for people who hear voices
To provide information, advice and support to people who hear voices, their family, friends
To provide training and education for mental health services and practitioners

Practices and philosophy
These networks are designed to support voice hearers specifically through local hearing voices support groups, where people who hear voices are afforded the opportunity in a non-medical setting to share their experiences, coping mechanisms, and explanatory frameworks. These groups are run in different ways and some are exclusive to individuals who hear voices, while others are supported by mental health workers. Groups are based in a range of settings, from community centers, libraries, churches, child and adolescent mental health services, prisons, and inpatient units.

Groups are designed to function as peer support groups meant foster socialization and belonging, not therapy and treatment. Members are encouraged to talk about their experiences, to learn what the voices mean to them, and how to gain control over their experiences. Should members desire to, groups can help members explore the relationship between their life history and their experience of hearing voices.

Studies show that members found attending hearing voices groups a largely positive experience, being able to share their experiences and explore and experiment with different coping strategies. Members also said that attending improved their self esteem, helped them make friends, and allowed them to feel more prepared for the future.

Studies have found that after attending hearing voices groups, members' hospital bed use decreased and there was a trend for less formal admissions. People's relationships with the voices were mostly improved and heard the voices less frequently. The voices were perceived as less powerful and having less control over them, and participants reported feeling better able to cope the voices and less alone. Importantly, evaluations showed that members improved in what they had identified as their own goals for the group.

National networks have developed considerably over the years and host websites, publish newsletters, guides to the voice hearing experience, and workbooks where individuals can record and explore their own experiences with voice hearing.

Romme has provided an intellectual basis for these groups in the book Accepting Voices, where he advocates a view that the hearing of voices is not necessarily an indication of mental illness and that patients should be encouraged to explore their voices and negotiate with them.

See also
 Hearing Voices Movement
 Paranoia Network

Publications

Articles, Chapters and Pamphlets
 
 
 
 
 
 
 
 
 
 
 
 
  [Challenging the omnipotence of voices: a cognitive approach to auditory hallucinations Pdf.]
 
 
 
Also 
 
 
 
 
 
  Pdf.
 
 Haddock G Slade P. Empowering people who hear voices in cognitive behavioral interventions with psychotic disorders, Routledge, London (1996)
 
 
 
 
 
 
 
  Pdf.
 
 
  Available online.
  Pdf.
  Preview.
 Described in: 
 See also: 
 and: 
 
 
 
 
 
 
 
  Read online.

References

External links
INTERVOICE
World Map of Hearing Voices Groups 
Hearing Voices Network England

Schizophrenia-related organizations
Mental health support groups
Organisations based in Manchester
Mental health organisations in the United Kingdom